Apremont is the name or part of the name of several communities:

France
 Apremont, Ain, in the Ain département
 Apremont, Ardennes, in the Ardennes département
 Apremont, Oise, in the Oise département
 Apremont, Haute-Saône, in the Haute-Saône département
 Apremont, Savoie, in the Savoie département
 Apremont, Vendée, in the Vendée département
 Apremont-la-Forêt, in the Meuse département
 Apremont-sur-Allier, in the Cher département

United States
 Apremont Triangle Historic District in Springfield, Massachusetts

See also
 Aspremont (disambiguation)